Bärke may refer to:

Norrbärke Court District in Dalarna, Sweden
Söderbärke Court District in Dalarna, Sweden